This is a timeline of Swedish history, comprising important legal and territorial changes and political events in Sweden and its predecessor states. To read about the background to these events, see History of Sweden. See also the list of Swedish monarchs and list of prime ministers of Sweden.

1st century - 5th century

6th century - 9th century

10th century

11th century

12th century

13th century

14th century

15th century

16th century

17th century

18th century

19th century

20th century

21st century

See also
Timeline of Faroese history
Timeline of Icelandic history

Cities in Sweden
 Timeline of Gothenburg
 Timeline of Stockholm history

References

Further reading

External links
 

Swedish